Classifier may refer to:
Classifier (linguistics), or measure word, especially in East Asian languages
Classifier handshape, in sign languages
Classifier (UML), in software engineering
Classification rule, in statistical classification, e.g.:
Hierarchical classifier
Linear classifier
Deductive classifier
Subobject classifier, in category theory
An air classifier or similar machine for sorting materials
Classifier (machine learning)

See also
Finite-state machine#Classifiers

Classification (disambiguation)
Classified (disambiguation)